WACB (860 AM) is a radio station licensed to Taylorsville, North Carolina, United States.  The station is owned by Apple City Broadcasting Co.

References

External links

ACB
Radio stations established in 1972